John Tapp may refer to:

 Johnny Tapp (race caller) (born 1941), Australian racecaller
 Jake Tapp, born John Tapp (born 1988), Canadian swimmer